Peter Hore (or Hoare) is an Australian prankster.

Peter Hoare or Hore may also refer to:

 Peter Hoare (tenor), British singer
 Peter Hore (historian) (born 1944), British historian
 Peter Hore (chemist), British chemist and academic
 Peter Merrick Hoare (1843–1894), English politician
 Two of the Hoare baronets:
 Sir Peter William Hoare, 7th Baronet (1898–1973)
 Sir Peter Richard David Hoare, 8th Baronet (1932–2004)